Jetalsar Junction railway station is an important junction railway station under Bhavnagar railway division of Western Railway Zone of Indian Railways.

Incharge-Sub Inspector-Dabi

Assistant Sub Inspector Deepak Meena

Major trains

Following trains halt at Jetalsar Junction railway station:

 22991/92 Bandra Terminus–Veraval Superfast Express
 19569/70 Rajkot–Veraval Express
 22957/58 Somnath Superfast Express
 11465/66 Somnath–Jabalpur Express (via Bina)
 11463/64 Somnath–Jabalpur Express (via Itarsi)
 19119/20 Ahmedabad–Somnath Intercity Express
 19251/52 Somnath–Okha Express
 19571/52 Rajkot–Porbandar Express
 12949/50 Kavi Guru Express

References

Railway stations in Rajkot district
Bhavnagar railway division
Railway junction stations in Gujarat